Flat Number Three is a 1934 British crime film directed by Leslie S. Hiscott starring Mary Glynne, Betty Astell and Cecil Parker. Its plot involves a lawyer who assists a widow who has killed her blackmailer.

It was made at Beaconsfield Studios as a quota quickie.

Cast
 Mary Glynne as Mrs. Rivington
 D. A. Clarke-Smith as Kettler
 Betty Astell as Trixie
 Lewis Shaw as Harry Rivington
 Cecil Parker as Hilary Maine
 Dorothy Vernon as Mrs. Crummitt

References

Bibliography
 Chibnall, Steve. Quota Quickies: The Birth of the British 'B' Film. British Film Institute, 2007.
 Low, Rachael. Filmmaking in 1930s Britain. George Allen & Unwin, 1985.
 Wood, Linda. British Films, 1927-1939. British Film Institute, 1986.

External links
 

1934 films
1930s English-language films
Films directed by Leslie S. Hiscott
1934 crime films
British crime films
Films shot at Beaconsfield Studios
Quota quickies
British black-and-white films
1930s British films